Tangwei station is a station of Line 11, Shenzhen Metro, in China. It opened on 28 June 2016.

Station layout

Exits

References

External links
 Shenzhen Metro Tangwei Station (Chinese)
 Shenzhen Metro Tangwei Station (English)

Railway stations in Guangdong
Shenzhen Metro stations
Bao'an District
Railway stations in China opened in 2016